Zombi is an American rock duo from Pittsburgh, Pennsylvania, consisting of Steve Moore on bass and synthesizers and Anthony Paterra on drums. The group makes use of looping to create multi-layered compositions. They have toured with Don Caballero, Isis, Orthrelm, The Psychic Paramount, Daughters, Red Sparowes, These Arms Are Snakes, Trans Am, and Goblin.

They are currently signed to Relapse Records. In 2006, the band signed with Belgian record label Hypertension Records to release Surface to Air on vinyl.

Moore was previously a member of Microwaves, a metal/no-wave band from Pittsburgh, Pennsylvania, and has toured with Red Sparowes. Paterra is a former member of the Pittsburgh band The 1985.

Their song "Sapphire" was remixed by Norwegian DJ/producer Prins Thomas.

Musical style and influences 

Zombi's musical style was influenced by film score composers John Carpenter and Goblin, electronic music artists Tangerine Dream and Vangelis, and progressive rock bands King Crimson and Genesis. 2011's Escape Velocity showed influence from Italo-disco and Krautrock. Following their 2013 tour with Goblin, Zombi's style became more rock-oriented for their following releases. The band takes its name from the Italian title of George A. Romero's Dawn of the Dead (Zombi).

Discography

Studio albums
 Cosmos (2004)
 Surface to Air (Relapse Records, 2006)
 Spirit Animal (2009)
 Escape Velocity (2011)
 Shape Shift (2015)
 2020 (2020)

Other releases
 Zombi demo (2002)
 Twilight Sentinel EP (2003)
 Zombi Anthology (re-issue of first two EPs, 2005)
 Digitalis tour EP (2006)
 Split LP with Maserati (2009)
 Slow Oscillations EP (2011)
 Evans City EP (2020)
 Liquid Crystal (2021)

References

External links
Facebook page
Steve Moore website
Steve Moore Interview
Zombi Interview on The Drone

American instrumental musical groups
Musical groups from Pittsburgh
Relapse Records artists
American space rock musical groups
Temporary Residence Limited artists
Hypertension Records artists